Artemisia ludoviciana is a North American species of flowering plant in the daisy family Asteraceae, known by several common names, including silver wormwood, western mugwort, Louisiana wormwood, white sagebrush, lobed cud-weed, prairie sage, and gray sagewort. 
 
Ludoviciana is the Latinized version of the word Louisiana.

Description
The stems bear linear leaves up to 11 cm long. The stems and foliage are covered in woolly gray or white hairs. The top of the stem is occupied by a narrow inflorescence of many nodding (hanging) flower heads. Each small head is a cup of hairy phyllaries surrounding a center of yellowish disc florets and is about 0.5 cm wide. The fruit is a minute achene. Flowers bloom July to October.

Distribution and habitat
The plant is native to North America where it is widespread across most of the United States, Canada, and Mexico. Some botanists suggest that eastern United States populations have been introduced from the western and central part of the continent. Its habitats include dry slopes, canyons, open pine woods, and dry prairies.

Subspecies
Subspecies include:
A. l. subsp. albula (Wooton) D.D.Keck—deserts from California and Colorado to Chihuahua, Sonora, Baja California
A. l.  subsp. candicans (Rydb.) D.D.Keck—Rocky Mountains and Cascade Range from Alberta, British Columbia to California, Colorado
A. l.  subsp. incompta (Nutt.) D.D.Keck—mountains from Alberta, British Columbia, to Mexico
A. l.  subsp. ludoviciana—western and central United States and western Canada
A. l.  subsp. mexicana (Willd. ex Spreng.) D.D.Keck— Mexico as far south as Puebla; United States as far north as Colorado and Missouri
A. l.  subsp. redolens (A.Gray) D.D.Keck—Durango, Chihuahua, Arizona, New Mexico, Texas
A. l.  subsp. sulcata (Rydb.) D.D.Keck—Chihuahua, Sonora, Arizona

Uses

Indigenous Usage
Indigenous tribes across the continent use the species as a medicinal plant, a source of fiber for crafting household items, and for ceremonial purposes. The Dakota people use this plant in smudging rituals to protect against maleficent spirits. The Apache, Chiricahua and Mescalero use it for spices, while Blackfoot tribe use it as a drug for dermatological use. The Cree and Blackfoot tribes use it in sweat lodges and the sun dance. Gros Ventre also use it for skin curing and as medicine against cold, because it is also antipyretic. The Meskwaki and Potawatomi use a tea made from this species as a treatment for sore throat and tonsillitis.

Cultivation
A. ludoviciana is cultivated as an ornamental plant. Being rhizomatous, it can spread aggressively in some climates and gardens. It grows in dry to medium moisture and well-drained soil. It requires full sun.

Popular cultivars include 'Valerie Finnis' and 'Silver Queen'. Both are hardy to USDA zone 4. 'Valerie Finnis' has held the Royal Horticultural Society's Award of Garden Merit since 1993.

References

External links

Calflora Database: Artemisia ludoviciana (Mugwort,  Silver wormwood)
Jepson Manual eFlora (TJM2) treatment of Artemisia ludoviciana
Calphotos Photo gallery, University of California

ludoviciana
Flora of Canada
Flora of Mexico
Flora of the Eastern United States
Flora of the Western United States
Flora of the Rocky Mountains
Flora of the Sierra Nevada (United States)
Plants described in 1818
Plants used in traditional Native American medicine
Garden plants of North America
Flora without expected TNC conservation status